The decimal value of the natural logarithm of 2 
is approximately

The logarithm of 2 in other bases is obtained with the formula

The common logarithm in particular is 

The inverse of this number is the binary logarithm of 10:
.

By the Lindemann–Weierstrass theorem, the natural logarithm of any natural number other than 0 and 1 (more generally, of any positive algebraic number other than 1) is a transcendental number.

Series representations

Rising alternate factorial
 This is the well-known "alternating harmonic series".

Binary rising constant factorial

Other series representations

 using 
 (sums of the reciprocals of decagonal numbers)

Involving the Riemann Zeta function

( is the Euler–Mascheroni constant and  Riemann's zeta function.)

BBP-type representations

(See more about Bailey–Borwein–Plouffe (BBP)-type representations.)

Applying the three general series for natural logarithm to 2 directly gives:

Applying them to  gives:

Applying them to  gives:

Applying them to  gives:

Representation as integrals
The natural logarithm of 2 occurs frequently as the result of integration.  Some explicit formulas for it include:

Other representations
The Pierce expansion is 

The Engel expansion is 

The cotangent expansion is 

The simple continued fraction expansion is 
,
which yields rational approximations, the first few of which are 0, 1, 2/3, 7/10, 9/13 and 61/88.

This generalized continued fraction:
,
also expressible as

Bootstrapping other logarithms

This employs

Example
If  with some small , then  and therefore

Taking , for example, generates

This is actually the third line in the following table of expansions of this type:

Starting from the natural logarithm of  one might use these parameters:

Known digits 
As of December 2018, it has been calculated to more digits than any other natural logarithm of a natural number, except that of 1.

See also
Rule of 72#Continuous compounding, in which  figures prominently
Half-life#Formulas for half-life in exponential decay, in which  figures prominently

References

External links
 
 

Logarithms
Mathematical constants
Real transcendental numbers